Colan is a village and civil parish in mid-Cornwall, England, United Kingdom. It is situated approximately three miles (5 km) east of Newquay. The electoral ward is called Colan and Mawgan. The population of this ward at the 2011 census was 4,256 
The hamlets of Bosoughan, Chapel, Gwills, Kestle Mill, Lane, Mountjoy, Quintrell Downs, Trebarber and Trencreek are in the parish. 
The Fir Hill, and Firhill Woods near Nanswhyden, contains the ruins of Fir Hill Manor. Colan Church dates to the thirteenth century.

References

External links

 

Villages in Cornwall
Civil parishes in Cornwall